Typhochlaena curumim is a species of tarantula, that is native to Mata do Pau-Ferro, Areia, in the state of Paraiba, Brazil. It is a member of the subfamily Aviculariinae.

Etymology 
The specific name is derived from the Brazilian indigenous Tupi language, meaning "child". It refers to the local children that found the type specimens high in a tree in Areia, State of Paraíba, Brazil, during an arachnological expedition.

Characteristics 
Typhochlaena curumim is only known from the female. It has a brown cephalothorax and legs, but the abdomen is metallic yellowish-green with a black dorsum with five black stripes extending laterally. It is characterized by the spermatheca, which is wide at the basal region but thins to a single or bifid spiralled region.

References 

Theraphosidae
Spiders described in 2012
Spiders of Brazil